Muḥammad ibn ʿAbd Allāh ibn Jaʿfar (Arabic: محمد بن عبدالله بن جعفر) was Zaynab's son. Together with his brother Awn, Muhammad accompanied Husayn ibn Ali and they were martyrs of Karbala.

Biography 

His father was Abd Allah ibn Ja'far ibn Abi Talib, a companion of the Islamic prophet Muhammad, and his mother was Zaynab, the daughter of Ali ibn Abi Talib and Fatima. His ancestor was Ja'far al-Tayyar, whom Muhammad (the prophet) had appointed as the head of the emigrants to Abyssinia.

Accompanying Husayn ibn Ali 
When Husayn ibn Ali moved from Mecca to Medina, Abd Allah ibn Ja'far wrote a letter to the Husayn and tried to change his mind. He sent the letter through his sons Muhammad and Awn, but when Abd Allah ibn Ja'far realized that the Imam is determined to go, he advised Muhammad and Awn to accompany Husayn ibn Ali.

On the day of Ashura 
Muhammad fought bravely and killed 10 warriors of enemy's army, but at the end was killed by Amir ibn Nahshal al-Tamimi.

References 

People killed at the Battle of Karbala
Husayn ibn Ali
Hussainiya
680 deaths

fa:محمد بن عبدالله بن جعفر